Acamprosate, sold under the brand name Campral, is a medication used along with counselling to treat alcohol use disorder.

Acamprosate is thought to stabilize chemical signaling in the brain that would otherwise be disrupted by alcohol withdrawal. When used alone, acamprosate is not an effective therapy for alcohol use disorder in most individuals; studies have found that acamprosate works best when used in combination with psychosocial support since the drug facilitates a reduction in alcohol consumption as well as full abstinence.

Serious side effects include  allergic reactions, abnormal heart rhythms, and low or high blood pressure, while less serious side effects include headaches, insomnia, and impotence. Diarrhea is the most common side-effect. Acamprosate should not be taken by people with kidney problems or allergies to the drug. It is unclear if use is safe during pregnancy.

Until it became generic in the United States, Campral was manufactured and marketed in the United States by Forest Laboratories, while Merck KGaA markets it outside the US.

Medical uses
Acamprosate is useful when used along with counseling in the treatment of alcohol use disorder. Over three to twelve months it increases the number of people who do not drink at all and the number of days without alcohol. It appears to work as well as naltrexone for maintenance of abstinence from alcohol, however naltrexone works slightly better for reducing alcohol cravings and heavy drinking, and acamprosate tends to work more poorly outside of Europe where treatment services are less robust.

Contraindications
Acamprosate is primarily removed by the kidneys and should not be given to people with severely impaired kidneys (creatinine clearance less than 30 mL/min). A dose reduction is suggested in those with moderately impaired kidneys (creatinine clearance between 30 mL/min and 50 mL/min). It is also contraindicated in those who have a strong allergic reaction to acamprosate calcium or any of its components.

Adverse effects
The US label carries warnings about increases of suicidal behavior, major depressive disorder, and kidney failure.

Adverse effects that caused people to stop taking the drug in clinical trials included diarrhea, nausea, depression, and anxiety.

Potential adverse effects include headache, stomach pain, back pain, muscle pain, joint pain, chest pain, infections, flu-like symptoms, chills, heart palpitations, high blood pressure, fainting, vomiting, upset stomach, constipation, increased appetite, weight gain, edema, sleepiness, decreased sex drive, impotence, forgetfulness, abnormal thinking, abnormal vision, distorted sense of taste, tremors, runny nose, coughing, difficulty breathing, sore throat, bronchitis, and rashes.

Pharmacology

Pharmacodynamics
The pharmacodynamics of acamprosate are complex and not fully understood; however, it is believed to act as an NMDA receptor antagonist and positive allosteric modulator of GABAA receptors.

Its activity on those receptors is indirect, unlike that of most other agents used in this context. An inhibition of the GABA-B system is believed to cause indirect enhancement of GABAA receptors. The effects on the NMDA complex are dose-dependent; the product appears to enhance receptor activation at low concentrations, while inhibiting it when consumed in higher amounts, which counters the excessive activation of NMDA receptors in the context of alcohol withdrawal.

The product also increases the endogenous production of taurine.

Ethanol and benzodiazepines act on the central nervous system by binding to the GABAA receptor, increasing the effects of the inhibitory neurotransmitter GABA (i.e., they act as positive allosteric modulators at these receptors). In alcohol use disorder, one of the main mechanisms of tolerance is attributed to GABAA receptors becoming downregulated (i.e. these receptors become less sensitive to GABA). When alcohol is no longer consumed, these down-regulated GABAA receptor complexes are so insensitive to GABA that the typical amount of GABA produced has little effect, leading to physical withdrawal symptoms; since GABA normally inhibits neural firing, GABAA receptor desensitization results in unopposed excitatory neurotransmission (i.e., fewer inhibitory postsynaptic potentials occur through GABAA receptors), leading to neuronal over-excitation (i.e., more action potentials in the postsynaptic neuron).  One of acamprosate's mechanisms of action is the enhancement of GABA signaling at GABAA receptors via positive allosteric receptor modulation.  It has been purported to open the chloride ion channel in a novel way as it does not require GABA as a cofactor, making it less liable for dependence than benzodiazepines. Acamprosate has been successfully used to control tinnitus, hyperacusis, ear pain, and inner ear pressure during alcohol use due to spasms of the tensor tympani muscle.

In addition, alcohol also inhibits the activity of N-methyl-D-aspartate receptors (NMDARs). Chronic alcohol consumption leads to the overproduction (upregulation) of these receptors. Thereafter, sudden alcohol abstinence causes the excessive numbers of NMDARs to be more active than normal and to contribute to the symptoms of delirium tremens and excitotoxic neuronal death. Withdrawal from alcohol induces a surge in release of excitatory neurotransmitters like glutamate, which activates NMDARs. Acamprosate reduces this glutamate surge. The drug also protects cultured cells from excitotoxicity induced by ethanol withdrawal and from glutamate exposure combined with ethanol withdrawal.

The substance also helps re-establish a standard sleep architecture by normalizing stage 3 and REM sleep phases, which is believed to be an important aspect of its pharmacological activity.

Pharmacokinetics
Acamprosate is not metabolized by the human body. Acamprosate's absolute bioavailability from oral administration is approximately 11%, and its bioavailability is decreased when taken with food.  Following administration and absorption of acamprosate, it is excreted unchanged (i.e., as acamprosate) via the kidneys.

Its absorption and elimination are very slow, with a Tmax of 6 hours and an elimination half life of over 30 hours.

History
Acamprosate was developed by Lipha, a subsidiary of Merck KGaA. and was approved for marketing in Europe in 1989.

In October 2001 Forest Laboratories acquired the rights to market the drug in the US.

It was approved by the FDA in July 2004.

The first generic versions of acamprosate were launched in the US in 2013.

As of 2015 acamprosate was in development by Confluence Pharmaceuticals as a potential treatment for fragile X syndrome.  The drug was granted orphan status for this use by the FDA in 2013 and by the EMA in 2014.

Society and culture

"Acamprosate" is the INN and BAN for this substance. "Acamprosate calcium" is the USAN and JAN. It is also technically known as N-acetylhomotaurine or as calcium acetylhomotaurinate.

It is sold under the brand name Campral.

Research
In addition to its apparent ability to help patients refrain from drinking, some evidence suggests that acamprosate is neuroprotective (that is, it protects neurons from damage and death caused by the effects of alcohol withdrawal, and possibly other causes of neurotoxicity).

See also 
 Homotaurine (tramiprosate)
 List of investigational anxiolytics
 List of investigational antidepressants

References 

Acetamides
Addiction psychiatry
Drug rehabilitation
Drugs with unknown mechanisms of action
AbbVie brands
Merck brands
Neuroprotective agents
Sulfonic acids
Substance-related disorders